Swords and Sandals is a series of turn-based fighting, action platformer, and real-time strategy video games, made for Flash, Windows, iOS and Android. They were released between 2005 and 2020 by the Australian company Whiskeybarrel Studios.

List of games

Swords and Sandals 1: Gladiator 
Gladiator, released in 2005, is the first title in the series. The main character is a pirate, shipwrecked on Doomtrek Island and forced into gladiatorism to survive. In character creation, the player can choose what the main character looks like, and how his skills are distributed. Each skill relates to a form of combat: the higher the level, the better he performs at them. In every match, the player controls the gladiator with icons around him, in a turn-based system, and usually against one opponent. After winning, the gladiator earns an amount of gold, which he can spend at the Armory (for armor), spend at the Smithy (for weapons), or save for later. Saving the game at any point is restricted to the full version of the game.

References

Flash games